Zalužje may refer to the following places in Bosnia and Herzegovina:

Zalužje (Bratunac)
Zalužje (Nevesinje)